Saint-Fuscien is a commune in the Somme department in Hauts-de-France in northern France. The name of the commune in Picard is Saint-Fuschien.

Geography

History
The commune's name is derived from Saint Fuscian (Fuscien, Fulcian) (3rd century), who is said to have been buried in the area, along with Saints Gentian and Victoricus (Victorice).

Population

Places of interest
 The church: 
Burnt down by arsonists in February 2005.

 Ruins of Saint-Fuscien abbey

Coat of arms (Blason)

See also
Communes of the Somme department

References

Communes of Somme (department)